Ngoring Lake or Ngoreng Lake or Eling Lake is a large freshwater lake in the Yellow River catchment, it is in the southeast of Qinghai Province.The name of lake means "Long Blue Lake" in Tibetan language.

References

Lakes of Qinghai
Yellow River
Lakes of China
Ramsar sites in China